Pont-Rouge is a city along the Jacques-Cartier River in southern Quebec, Canada. In the Canada 2021 Census the population was 10,121 inhabitants.

History
The first efforts to colonise the area came around 1769.

On April 15, 1867, the archbishop of Quebec, Charles-François Baillargeon, founded the parish
of Sainte-Jeanne-de-Neuville from portions of Cap-Santé, Saint-Basile, and Neuville. After the separation of the parish in two in 1911 (the village of Pont-Rouge and the parish of Sainte-Jeanne-de-Pont-Rouge), the new City of Pont-Rouge was established when these two municipalities merged on January 3, 1996.

Transportation had considerable influence on the development of the parish, mainly the two bridges and the construction of the Canadian Pacific Railway bridge in 1874. The Royal Bridge (now called Pont Déry), was reconstructed several times because of the weakness of the centre of the bridge. This bridge served its purpose for the transportation of heavy loads and mail between Quebec and Montreal.  The bridge was a toll bridge, and the money served the construction of a second bridge le pont Rouge, which was free. It united the western part to the eastern part of Dupont Street, named in honour of Father Charles-François Dupont, who was priest there from 1917 to 1933.  A newer bridge has now replaced this bridge as of 2009.

Demographics 

Population trend:
 Population in 2021: 10121 (2016 to 2021 population change: 9.5%)
 Population in 2016: 9240
 Population in 2011: 8723 
 Population in 2006: 7518
 Population in 2001: 7146
 Population in 1996:
 Sainte-Jeanne-de-Pont-Rouge (municipality): 2145
 Pont-Rouge (village): 4676
 Population in 1991:
 Sainte-Jeanne-de-Pont-Rouge (municipality): 1966
 Pont-Rouge (village): 4133

Mother tongue:
 English as first language: 0.7%
 French as first language: 98.2%
 English and French as first language: 0%
 Other as first language: 1.1%

Administration

References

External links
	

Cities and towns in Quebec
Incorporated places in Capitale-Nationale